Events from the year 1779 in Scotland.

Incumbents

Law officers 
 Lord Advocate – Henry Dundas; 
 Solicitor General for Scotland – Alexander Murray

Judiciary 
 Lord President of the Court of Session – Lord Arniston, the younger
 Lord Justice General – The Viscount Stormont
 Lord Justice Clerk – Lord Barskimming

Events 
 Bowmore distillery on Islay is established.
 Cotton mill at Rothesay, Bute, is established.
 New bridge over River Deveron between Banff and Macduff, designed by John Smeaton, is completed.
 Bridge of Awe is completed.
 David Hume's Dialogues concerning Natural Religion are published posthumously and anonymously.

Births 
 1 May – Alexander Morison, physician and psychiatrist (died 1866)
 2 May – John Galt, novelist and entrepreneur (died 1839)
 26 October – Henry Cockburn, judge and man of letters (died 1854)
 20 December – Alexander Walker, physiologist (died 1852)
 22 December – Ralph Wardlaw, Presbyterian clergyman (died 1853)
 James Barr, composer (died 1860)
 James Marr Brydone, naval surgeon (died 1866 in England)
 Patrick Campbell, army officer and diplomat (died 1857)
 John Douglas, 7th Marquess of Queensberry, Whig politician (died 1856)
 James Forbes, inspector-general of army hospitals (died 1837 in London)
 James Mudie, settler in Australia (died 1852)
 Hugh Murray, geographer (died 1846 in London)

Deaths 
 10 March (bur.) – John Rutherford, physician (born 1695)
 John Dalrymple, political writer (born 1734)

The arts
 George Richardson's Iconology is published.

See also 

Timeline of Scottish history
 1779 in Great Britain

References 

 
Years of the 18th century in Scotland
Scotland
1770s in Scotland